State Route 154 (SR 154) is a  state highway that serves as an east–west connection between Coffeeville and Thomasville through Clarke County. SR 154 intersects SR 69 at its western terminus and US 43 at its eastern terminus.

Route description
SR 154 begins at an intersection with SR 69 north of Coffeeville. From this point, SR 154 follows a meandering east-to-northeast course through central Clarke County en route to its eastern terminus at US 43/SR 13 in Thomasville.

Major intersections

See also

References

154
Transportation in Clarke County, Alabama